A collegian may be:

a member of a college
One of the Collegians or Collegiants, a religious sect founded in Holland in 1619
an inmate in a prison (slang)

See also
The Collegian (disambiguation), name of several college and school newspapers
Old Collegians (disambiguation)